Neurogymnurus is an extinct genus of gymnures. Species are from the Miocene of Turkey and the Oligocene of the Czech Republic, France, Kazakhstan and Turkey.

 Species
 †Neurogymnurus cayluxi Filhol 1877
 synonym †Cayluxotherium elegans Filhol, 1880
 synonym  †Necrogymllurus cayluxi Filhol, 1877 in M. Friant, 1934, Viret, 1947 and Lavocat, 1951.
 †Neurogymnurus indricotherii Lopatin 1999

References 

 Note sur des Mammifères fossiles nouveaux provenant des phospharites du Quercy. H Filhol, 1880
 Découverte de mammifères nouveaux dans les dépôts de phosphate de chaux du Quercy. H Filhol, CR Acad Sci, 1880

External links 

 
 

Prehistoric placental genera
Gymnures
Taxa named by Henri Filhol